Clive Trotman (born 29 April 1983) is a Panamanian football defender.

Club career
After spending several seasons in the local league, Trottman moved abroad to play alongside compatriot Brunet Hay at Colombian side Academia in January 2006.
Trottman joined Chorrillo from Atlético Chiriquí in summer 2010.

International career
2003 - Sub20 - Played sub20 Qualifying for the World United Arab Emirates in 2003.
2003 - Junior World Cup 2003 (UAE)
2004/2005 - Choosing Absolute, Qualifying for the World Cup Germany 2006.

He was called-up for a senior team game against Cuba in May 2004.

References

External links

1983 births
Living people
Sportspeople from Colón, Panama
Association football defenders
Panamanian footballers
Panamanian expatriate footballers
Sporting San Miguelito players
C.D. Árabe Unido players
Academia F.C. players
Atlético Chiriquí players
Unión Deportivo Universitario players
Expatriate footballers in Colombia
Panama international footballers